Mpatamanga Hydroelectric Power Station, also Mpatamanga Power Station, is a planned  hydroelectric power project to be constructed in Malawi.

Location
The power station will be located at Mpatamanga, on the Shire River, in Blantyre District, in the Southern Region of Malawi. The coordinates of the village of Mpatamanga are: 15°43'11.0"S,  34°43'35.0"E (Latitude:-15.719722; Longitude:34.726389).

Overview
Mpatamanga Power Station is a proposed  hydroelectric power plant that will be constructed on the Shire River, downstream of the Nkhula A HPP & Nkhula B HPP, as well as the Tedzani Hydroelectric Power Station, but upstream of the Kapichira Hydroelectric Power Station. Mpatamanga HPP will differ from earlier hydro-power plants in Malawi, in that it will have a reservoir, which will allow Egenco to store water and allow for the expansion of Kapichira HPP. The reservoir will also facilitate the development of a planned irrigation scheme.

Timeline
As of April 2017, the environmental impact and social assessment (EISA) and the feasibility study (FS), both funded by the World Bank were ongoing. Meanwhile, the government of Malawi was negotiating for international funding to start construction.

Developments
In 2019, the planned capacity of the power station was reduced from 350 megawatts to 258 megawatts. The consortium developing this power station was announced to include the following entities as illustrated in the table below.

In August 2021, it was reported that IFC InfraVentures had made an equity investment of US$150 million into the development of this project. Also the same entity had taken over as lead developer and development manager for the infrastructure development. As of then the engineering, procurement and construction (EPC) contractor was yet to be selected.

Recent events
In September 2022, Afrik21.africa reported that the design of the project had been altered to comprise two power stations supplied by the same reservoir.

Mpatamanga 1
The main power station, with capacity of 309 MW is intended to supply the national grid during peak hours.

Mpatamanga 2
A smaller power station with capacity of 41 MW will sit adjacent to the main power plant and the two will be synchronized.

The composition of the Mpatamanga HPP Consortium had also changed again. The table below illustrates the new shareholders, as of that time.

See also

List of power stations in Malawi
List of hydropower stations in Africa
List of hydroelectric power stations

References

External links
 Website of Electricity Generation Company Malawi Limited
 Africa: BII invests $200m in hydropower with Norfund and Scatec As of 24 June 2022. 

Hydroelectric power stations in Malawi
Proposed hydroelectric power stations
Southern Region, Malawi
Proposed renewable energy power stations in Malawi